There are several heraldry societies around the world. Some of the more notable ones include:

The Heraldry Society (in England)
The Heraldry Society of New Zealand
The Heraldry Society of Scotland
The Heraldry Society of Southern Africa
The Royal Heraldry Society of Canada
The American Heraldry Society